The 1975 Federation Cup was the 13th edition of the most important competition between national teams in women's tennis.  31 nations participated in the tournament, which was held at the Aixoise C.C., Aix-en-Provence, France, from 5–11 May. Czechoslovakia defeated Australia in the final, giving Czechoslovakia their first title.

Participating Teams

Draw
All ties were played at the Aixoise C.C., Aix-en-Provence, France, on clay courts.

1st and 2nd Round losing teams play in Consolation rounds

First round

Israel vs. Belgium

Luxembourg vs. Romania

Brazil vs. Italy

South Africa vs. Norway

Canada vs. Japan

New Zealand vs. Sweden

Switzerland vs. United States

Great Britain vs. Austria

France vs. Bulgaria

Indonesia vs. Hungary

Czechoslovakia vs. Ireland

Uruguay vs. Netherlands

Yugoslavia vs. Argentina

Denmark vs. West Germany

Second round

Australia vs. Belgium

Romania vs. Italy

South Africa vs. Japan

Sweden vs. United States

Great Britain vs. Spain

France vs. Hungary

Czechoslovakia vs. Netherlands

Argentina vs. West Germany

Quarterfinals

Australia vs. Italy

South Africa vs. United States

Great Britain vs. France

Czechoslovakia vs. West Germany

Semifinals

Australia vs. United States

France vs. Czechoslovakia

Final

Australia vs. Czechoslovakia

Consolation rounds

Draw

First round

Yugoslavia vs. Belgium

Uruguay vs. Ireland

Indonesia vs. Bulgaria

Luxembourg vs. Brazil

New Zealand vs. Switzerland

Norway vs. Canada

Second round

Denmark vs. Belgium

Romania vs. Uruguay

Sweden vs. Indonesia

Japan vs. Austria

Brazil vs. Netherlands

New Zealand vs. Hungary

Quarterfinals

Belgium vs. Romania

Indonesia vs. Japan

Hungary vs. Canada

Semifinals

Belgium vs. Japan

Netherlands vs. Hungary

Final

Japan vs. Hungary

References

Billie Jean King Cups by year
Federation
Tennis tournaments in France
Federation Cup
Federation Cup
Federation Cup